The men's hammer throw event was part of the track and field athletics programme at the 1920 Summer Olympics. The competition was held on Wednesday, August 18, 1920. 12 throwers from 5 nations competed; four from Sweden, four from the United States, two from Canada, one from Great Britain, and one from Finland. No nation had more than 4 athletes, suggesting the limit had been reduced from the 12 maximum in force in 1908 and 1912. The event was won by Patrick Ryan of the United States, the nation's fifth consecutive victory in the event. Carl Johan Lind took silver, earning Sweden's first medal in the hammer throw. Another American, Basil Bennett, earned bronze.

Background

This was the fifth appearance of the event, which has been held at every Summer Olympics except 1896. Four of the 14 competitors from the pre-war 1912 Games returned: gold medalist Matt McGrath of the United States and three Swedes: fourth-place finisher Robert Olsson, fifth-place finisher Carl Johan Lind, and seventh-place finisher Nils Linde. McGrath, who would earn seven AAU championships from 1908 to 1926, and fellow American and world-record holder Patrick Ryan, who would win eight AAU championships in that time, were expected to dominate the event.

Finland made its debut in the event. The United States appeared for the fifth time, the only nation to have competed at each appearance of the event to that point.

Competition format

The competition continued to use the divided-final format used since 1908, with results carrying over between "rounds". The number of finalists expanded from three in previous Games to six in 1920. Each athlete received three throws in the qualifying round. The top six men advanced to the final, where they received an additional three throws. The best result, qualifying or final, counted.

Records

These were the standing world and Olympic records (in metres) prior to the 1920 Summer Olympics.

No new world or Olympic records were set during the competition.

Schedule

Results

The best six hammer throwers qualified for the final. McGrath injured his knee during the second throw in qualifying and withdrew, though still had thrown far enough to take fifth place.

References

Sources
 
 

Hammer throw
Hammer throw at the Olympics